Robert L. Charette (January 6, 1923 – January 16, 1988) was an American politician in the state of Washington. He served in the Washington House of Representatives from 1967 to 1979 and in the Senate from 1963 to 1967.

References

1923 births
1988 deaths
Democratic Party members of the Washington House of Representatives
Democratic Party Washington (state) state senators